Synophalos is an extinct genus of bivalved arthropod. The genus contains a single species, Synophalos xynos, found in the Cambrian Stage 3-aged Chengjiang biota of Yunnan, China. The body has approximately 6 (possibly 7) abdominal segments, which terminate in a forked unsegmented tail. It is noted for having been found in unusual chain-like associations where up to 20 individuals were connected via the insertion of the tail into the head carapace of the preceding individual. Similar behaviour is not known in any other arthropod, living or extinct. Its purpose is unknown, though it may have served a reproductive, migratory, or defensive purpose, with the authors of the describing paper considering migration as its most likely function. In 2009, Xian-Guang et al. tentatively referred Synophalos to Waptiidae.

References 

Cambrian arthropods
Fossil taxa described in 2009
Hymenocarina